Sorrel, Rumex acetosa, is a perennial herb cultivated as a leaf vegetable.

Sorrel may also refer to:

Plants
 Averrhoa bilimbi or tree sorrel, a fruit-bearing tree
 Oxalidaceae, family of plants known as the woodsorrel family
 Oxalis, largest genus in the Oxalidaceae, known as woodsorrels, particularly:
 Oxalis enneaphylla, scurvy-grass sorrel
Oxalis oregana, redwood sorrel
 Oxyria digyna, alpine sorrel or mountain sorrel
 Roselle (plant) (Hibiscus sabdariffa), known as Jamaican sorrel, and in the Caribbean simply as "sorrel"
 Rumex, genus of plants containing species known as sorrels, particularly:
 Rumex acetosella, sheep's sorrel
 Rumex scutatus, French sorrel
 Sourwood or sorrel tree (Oxydendrum arboreum), a tree native to North America

People 

 Sorrel, a male character in the animated film Pokémon the Movie: I Choose You!
 Sorrel Carson (1920–2005), Irish actress, director, and teacher who formed the Academy of Live and Recorded Art in London
 Sorrel Hays (1941-2020), a female American pianist, composer, and artist
 Sorel Bliss, a character in Noël Coward’s play Hay Fever (1924)

Other uses
 Sorrel, Louisiana, United States, a census-designated place
 Sorrel (drink) or hibiscus tea, a herbal tea infusion popular in Jamaica
 Sorrel (horse), an alternative term for a reddish-colored horse, more often known as "chestnut"
Old Sorrel (foaled 1915), America Quarter Horse stallion
Moxley Sorrel (1838–1901), American Civil War soldier
Hetty Sorrel, fictional character in George Eliot's novel Adam Bede
Heliophorus sena or sorrel sapphire, Indian butterfly
USS Sorrel (1864), American navy ship

See also
Rosalie Sorrels (1933-2017), American singer-songwriter
Sorel (disambiguation)
Sorell (disambiguation)
Sorrell (disambiguation)
Sea sorrel (disambiguation)

Disambiguation pages with given-name-holder lists
English feminine given names
English unisex given names